Parviainen is a Finnish surname. Notable people with the surname include:

Aki Parviainen (born 1974), Finnish javelin thrower
Emmi Parviainen (born 1985), Finnish actor
Hannu-Pekka "HP" Parviainen (born 1981), Finnish snowboarder
Heidi Parviainen (born 1979), Finnish singer
Janne Parviainen (born 1973), Finnish drummer
Jouko Parviainen (born 1958), Finnish skier
Kaisa Parviainen (1914–2002), Finnish javelin thrower
Kalle Parviainen (born 1982), Finnish footballer

See also
Mount Parviainen, a mountain in Antarctica

Finnish-language surnames